The Sisters of Mary, Mother of the Church is a Roman Catholic religious public association of the faithful in the Diocese of Spokane in Washington.  The group was formed by 15 nuns from Mount Saint Michael who were expelled in June 2007 from the Congregation of Mary Immaculate Queen because they no longer accepted their former congregation's Sedevacantist teachings.  The groups was approved in 2008 by Spokane Bishop William Skylstad after reconciling with the Roman Catholic Church.

References

External links
 Official Site

Catholic female orders and societies
Traditionalist Catholic nuns and religious sisters